"Full Leather Jacket" is the 21st episode of the HBO original series The Sopranos and the eighth of the show's second season. It was written by Robin Green and Mitchell Burgess, directed by Allen Coulter, and originally aired on March 5, 2000.

Starring
 James Gandolfini as Tony Soprano
 Lorraine Bracco as Dr. Jennifer Melfi
 Edie Falco as Carmela Soprano
 Michael Imperioli as Christopher Moltisanti
 Dominic Chianese as Corrado Soprano, Jr.
 Vincent Pastore as Pussy Bonpensiero *
 Steven Van Zandt as Silvio Dante
 Tony Sirico as Paulie Gualtieri
 Robert Iler as Anthony Soprano, Jr.
 Jamie-Lynn Sigler as Meadow Soprano
 Drea de Matteo as Adriana La Cerva 
 David Proval as Richie Aprile
 Aida Turturro as Janice Soprano
 Nancy Marchand as Livia Soprano *

* = credit only

Guest starring

Synopsis
Meadow hopes to go to Berkeley; her parents want to prevent it. The Sopranos' neighbor Jean Cusamano has a sister, Joan O'Connell, who is a prestigious alumna of Georgetown University. Carmela cajoles Jean into asking Joan to write a letter of recommendation for Meadow. Joan declines, but Carmela visits her, presents her with a ricotta pie, and insists, "I want you to write that letter." Jean reports to Carmela that the letter has been written, and Carmela asks for a copy.

Silvio and Paulie pressure Richie to build Beansie a wheelchair ramp for his house, as partial reparation for crippling him. Richie scornfully refuses, but when he learns that these instructions came from Tony, he sends his nephew Vito Spatafore and his construction workers to fully adapt Beansie's home.

Richie has a leather jacket which he obtained years ago from the feared mobster Rocco DiMeo. He gives it to Tony, who accepts it reluctantly but politely. Richie attaches great importance to the jacket, and to the act of giving it to Tony. He later sees it being worn by the husband of the Sopranos' maid and is deeply offended.

Adriana, embarrassed in a restaurant by Christopher, has left him and gone back to her mother's. He goes to her, proposes marriage, and presents her with a ring. She says she loves him, and the ring. In bed, he tells her, "I'm back on track, rededicating myself"—to her and to Tony.

Matt and Sean continue to work with Christopher, breaking into safes. They are introduced to Richie and laugh ingratiatingly at his abusive jokes about Chris. They try and fail to make casual contact with Tony at the Bada Bing. They are humiliated when Furio collects Tony's cut from the safe-cracking operations and takes an additional $1,000 for himself. Waiting for a meeting with Chris, who does not show up, they feel they are getting nowhere and must do something drastic. They ambush Chris as he is leaving a diner, imagining that this will gain them favor with Richie. Chris is shot three times and left unconscious. Sean is killed. Matt, unhurt, escapes and asks for Richie's protection; Richie, furious, chases him away.

Chris lies in hospital in a coma. Tony, in a broken voice, says, "How could this happen?"

First appearances
 Liz La Cerva: The mother of Adriana La Cerva.
 Bryan Spatafore: The brother of Vito Spatafore.
 Donald "Donny K" Kafranza: A soldier in Richie Aprile's crew.

Deceased
 Sean Gismonte: shot in the head in self-defense by Christopher Moltisanti.

Title reference
The episode's title is a play on the 1987 film Full Metal Jacket, whose title refers to full metal jacket bullets. Here, it alludes to the leather jacket that Richie gave to Tony. Also, after Christopher is shot, the camera pans the sidewalk showing the metal cartridge casings that have been expelled from the weapons.

Production
 Saundra Santiago plays a dual role in this episode, portraying twin sisters Jean Cusamano and Joannie O'Connell.
 Although the episode was the eighth of the second season, it was the seventh to be produced.
 Unlike most other episodes, there is no song played over the end credits. Instead, all that is heard is the sound of Christopher's ventilator and the electrocardiogram machine.
 This is the shortest episode of the series, running just under 43 minutes.
Sean Gismonte is killed by Christopher because Sean was restrained in the car by a seatbelt. This is similar to Livia's story to A.J. of how seatbelts can kill, from the previous episode, "D-Girl".

Music
The song played during the opening scene of this episode when the Soprano family eats Chinese food, is "Baker Street" by Gerry Rafferty. Later, when Christopher and Adriana are in bed together, Christopher says "I'm rededicating myself, right down the line." "Right Down the Line" is the title of another Gerry Rafferty song from the 1978 album City to City.
The song played when Richie is reading the paper, and then is joined by Paulie and Silvio, is "Dancing in the Dark", sung by Tony Bennett on the 1993 album Steppin' Out.
The song played when Sean and Matt approach Tony in the Bada Bing's men's room is "Lap Dance" by the Jon Spencer Blues Explosion.
The song played when Furio and his partner collect from Sean and Matt is "Up 'N Da Club" by 2nd II None. Since 2022 the song has gained a reputation as an internet meme among Sopranos fans.
The song played as Richie and Carmela talk (while the maid and her husband are picking up a television) is "Fields of Gold" by Sting.
The song played when Matt and Sean sit at the Bada Bing, reflecting on their status, is "Fuck With Your Head" by DJ Rap.

Filming locations 
Listed in order of first appearance:

 North Caldwell, New Jersey
 Montclair, New Jersey
 Lodi, New Jersey
 Newark, New Jersey
 Satin Dolls in Lodi, New Jersey
 Satriale's Pork Store in Kearny, New Jersey
 Kearny, New Jersey

Additionally, Turtle Back Zoo, Willowbrook Mall, and Short Hills are mentioned.

References

External links
"Full Leather Jacket"  at HBO

The Sopranos (season 2) episodes
2000 American television episodes
Television episodes directed by Allen Coulter

fr:La Veste